Strength athletics in Canada refers to the various strongman (strength athlete) events throughout Canada and its provinces in the sport of  [strength athletics] in association with the World's Strongest Man. The roots of strongman in Canada go back long before the birth of WSM in 1977, particularly with [Louis Cyr] in the early 1900s, who was deemed the "Strongest Man on Earth" during his lifetime. Four Canadian athletes have finished on the podium, placing 2nd in 1982 with Tom Magee and 3rd in 2005 with Dominic Filiou, Jean-François Caron placing 3rd in 2020, and Maxime Boudreault placing 3rd in 2021. The provinces of Canada hold annual championships with the top 2-4 athletes going on to the National Championships at the end of the year to crown Canada's Strongest Man.

Canada's Strongest Man

Canada's Strongest Man is an annual strongman competition held in Canada, and features exclusively Canadian athletes. The event first started in 1982, with Tom Magee winning the first 2 titles. Hugo Girard would later go on to win a record 6 titles; a record that would later be beaten despite Hugo's proclamation that nobody would ever even go as far as to match it. After Hugo withdrew from competition due to injuries, fellow training partner and 5 time runner-up Jessen Paulin won in 2005 & 2006. Dominic Filiou won in 2007, becoming the first man to defeat Hugo Girard on Canadian soil. After the dust had settled following the end of Hugo's era, a new champion would emerge: Jean-Francois Caron. Jean-Francois, or "J-F", has dominated strongman in Canada since 2011, winning the title of Canada's Strongest Man every year and ushering in a new era of Strongman in Canada. J-F has also nurtured the success of other athletes and has worked towards developing the success of the sport in the country as a whole.

Official results - top three places

Results courtesy of www.ontariostrongman.ca

Repeat champions

Quebec's Strongest Man

Results courtesy of www.ontariostrongman.ca

Ontario's Strongest Man

Results courtesy of www.ontariostrongman.ca

Western Canada's Strongest Man

Results courtesy of July 1st Western Canadas Strongest Man on Facebook

Atlantic Canada's Strongest Man

Results courtesy of www.acstrongman.com

North America's Strongest Man

North America's Strongest Man is an annual strongman competition consisting of athletes from both United States and Canada. The event was established in 1992.

Official results - top three places

Results courtesy of David Horne's World of Grip: http://www.davidhorne-gripmaster.com/strongmanresults.html

References

Strongmen competitions
Sport in Canada by sport